Ministry of Youth and Sport may refer to:

 Ministry of Youth and Sport (Ethiopia)
 Ministry of Youth and Sport (Romania)